Kalanad railway station is a major railway station serving the town of Kasaragod in the Kasaragod District of Kerala, India. It lies in the Shoranur–Mangalore section of the Southern Railways.  Trains halting at the station connect the town to prominent cities in India such as Thiruvananthapuram, Kochi, Chennai, Kollam, Bangalore, Kozhikode, Coimbatore, Mangalore, Mysore  and so forth.

References

Railway stations in Kasaragod district
Palakkad railway division